Javier Cremades (born 25 August 1965) is a Spanish lawyer, founder and president of the international law firm Cremades & Calvo-Sotelo and president of the World Jurist Association.

Early life and education 
Cremades was born in Ceuta. He has a Doctor of Constitutional Law degree from the University of Regensburg (Germany), a Doctor of Law from the UNED (Spain) and a Doctor Honoris Causa from the International University of Valencia (Spain).

In 1989 he joined the Chair of Public Law at the University of Regensburg as scientific assistant to Professor Rainer Arnold, who would be his thesis advisor. His doctoral thesis was Los límites de la libertad de expresión en el ordenamiento jurídico español ("The limits of freedom of expression in the Spanish legal system"). After finishing his doctoral studies in Germany, he moved to Madrid in 1993, linking his academic career to the Spanish experts in constitutional law, Antonio Torres del Moral, and Manuel Aragón Reyes. He taught constitutional law for 15 years at the Universidad Carlos III and the UNED, and later created and directed the postgraduate programs "Master in Business and Law of Telecommunications, Internet and Audiovisual" (since 1997), "Master in Business and Law of Energy" (since 2007) and "Master in Management of Business Legal Advice" (since 2007).

Professional career 
He worked at Garrigues law firm from 1993 to 1995,  in international relations and in the shaping and practice of telecommunications law. As an expert lawyer in freedom of expression, he was active in the defense of the media and journalists (Grupo Prisa, ABC, El Español, Asociación de Editores...). Cremades also advised international companies in the telecommunications sector when Spain liberalized its stock market. One of the best known areas of his professional activity has been leading the international defense of the Venezuelan politician Leopoldo López, and different international actions as the International Manifesto of Jurists calling for the immediate release of López.

He has been a defender of small shareholders and investors, being the promoter of the Spanish Association of Minority Shareholders of Listed Companies, AEMEC, where he is Secretary General. On this point he stood out for taking on the defense of those affected by the Madoff Case and was elected president of the Madoff Case Global Law Firm Alliance. The alliance includes 34 firms from 21 countries. 

Cremades has worked as an advisor in the drafting of the legal systems of several nations. He is president of the Spanish Eisenhower Fellowships Association. In 2019 chaired the World Law Congress with Javier Solana, and was elected president of the World Jurist Association.

Publications 
He is the author and coordinator of academic publications in public law (mainly on freedom of expression and information) and in private law, particularly on corporate law. He has also been a regular columnist in several media (El País, El Mundo, ABC, Expansión, Diario 16, El Tiempo, CNN...)

Among his publications, those related to the digital irruption stand out: El Paraíso digital (Plaza y Janés, 2001) and Micropoder: La fuerza del ciudadano en la era digital (Espasa Calpe, 2007). Among the publications with several authors stand out: E-lawyer with Enric Badia (La Ley-Actualidad, 2007); Régimen jurídico de internet (Wolters Kluwer 2001), developed with Miguel Fernández Ordoñez and Rafael Illescas and El planeta internet (Arguval, 2002) with Marian Carnicer and Santiago Rodríguez Bajón.

His doctoral expertise in terms of freedom of expression led him to publish, among others:  Los límites de la libertad de expresión en el ordenamiento jurídico español, "The limits of freedom of expression in the Spanish legal system" (La Ley-Actualidad, 1995) and Derecho de las telecomunicaciones "Telecommunications Law" (La Ley-Actualidad, 2002) and with Pablo Mayor La liberalización de las telecomunicaciones en un mundo global "Telecommunications liberalization in a global world" (Wolters Kluwer/Ministerio de Fomento, 1999). His interests have also covered relations with China: China y sus libertades, un dilema para el siglo XXI, "China and its freedoms, a dilemma for the 21st century" (Espasa Calpe, 2008) and the energy sector:  La energía secuestrada, "Hijacked energy" (Pearson Editores, 2013).

He is the publisher director of the series ""Derecho de las Telecomunicaciones"" and is on the editorial board of the "Revista Española de Derecho de las Telecomunicaciones" and the "Revista de la Contratación Electrónica".

Acknowledgements 
 Lawyer of the Year in Spain (2015) Forbes Magazine.
 Jurist of the Year (2018) World Jurist Association.
 Doctor Honoris Causa, International University of Valencia (2013).
 Ordine della Stella d`Italia (2019) Government of the Italian Republic
 Medal of Honor of the Malaga Bar Association (2020).
Medal of Honour, International Union of Lawyers (UIA, 2021).
Full Member,  Royal European Academy of Doctors (2021).
Barcelona Bar Association Medal (ICAB, 2022).

References

External links 
 Diario Jurídico
 El País
 El Independiente

20th-century Spanish lawyers
1965 births
Spanish writers
Living people
21st-century Spanish lawyers